Giulia Boschi (born 17 December 1962) is an Italian film and television actress.

Life and career 
Born in Rome, Boschi is the daughter of the television presenter Aba Cercato. She made her film debut in 1984, in Francesca Comencini's Pianoforte, and for this performance she was awarded as best actress at the Rio de Janeiro Film Festival. She was also awarded a Silver Ribbon for best new actress. In 1988 she won the Ciak d'oro for best supporting actress in Da grande.

Filmography

References

External links 

 

Italian film actresses
1962 births
Actresses from Rome
Italian television actresses
Living people
Nastro d'Argento winners
Ciak d'oro winners
20th-century Italian actresses
21st-century Italian actresses